Akanthou is a village on the northern coast of Cyprus. It is under the de facto control of Northern Cyprus. , it had a population of 1,459.

History 
The first settlement that can be linked with the modern-day Akanthou was in the Kouphes area, 2 miles to the northwest of Akanthou. Akanthou was established between the 7th and the 10th century at the place where the river passing through the village meets the sea. Following the Mamluk Arab raids in Cyprus, the coastal location was abandoned and the village moved to its present-day inland location. The name Akanthou, according to local tradition, comes from the name of a thorny bush present in the area, which is said to have provided protection for a beautiful woman, Anthousa, whom the Arab sailors tried to take captive.

Akanthou was recorded to be under the fiefdom of a nobleman called Sir John Gorap in 1385. In the 14th and 15th centuries, there are records that indicate that Akanthou hosted royal casalia of the Kingdom of Cyprus as well as sugar plantations.

It was the place of landing for Ottoman troops under Çıfıtoğlu Ahmet Pasha that came to Cyprus to suppress the rebellion headed by Boyacıoğlu Mehmet Agha against Ottoman rule between 1680 and 1687/88. General Louis Palma di Cesnola wrote in 1877 that the village relied on its production of halloumi. Around 2,000,000  halloumis were produced each year in the caves around the village and exported to cities abroad such as Smyrna, Port Said and Alexandria.

Historical sites 
 Çiftlikdüzü - the Neolithic site could be the earliest settlement in Cyprus. Since 1998, the site has been excavated by archaeologists from TÜBİTAK and the Cyprus International University. It is dated to 8400 BC. The inhabitants were hunter-gatherers and circular adobe houses, as well as a small number of human bones, are among the artifacts found in the excavations.
It was established as a colony by the inhabitants of Pergamon in Asia Minor following the Trojan War. The city survived for over a millennium. It was frequently struck by pirate raids, and a tunnel was constructed that provided a way of escape to the sea. The raids were associated with mass rape of women and plunder, and the raiders would take away the women and the animals. The city was finally abandoned due to such raids. The inhabitants moved to Akanthou.
Church of Panagia Pergaminiotisa in Pergamon -- this was originally a large Byzantine church with three naves and three apses, but was destroyed in either an earthquake or due to Arab raids in the 7th century. The present-day church was built in the 11th or 12th century. Its walls were filled with ornate frescoes, but these were stolen following the Turkish invasion in 1974. They were found in Germany in possession of the thief, Aydın Dikmen, in 1997 and returned. The church was restored in 2009.

Demographics 

Historically, the village was predominantly populated by Greek Cypriots according to census data. The 1831 census, recorded the adult male population as 10 Turkish Cypriots and 163 Greek Cypriots. Around 1300 Greek Cypriots were displaced from the village following the Turkish invasion of Cyprus in 1974. The village was then chosen as the place of resettlement for the displaced Turkish Cypriots of Mari, but only 100 were resettled in the village as they mostly insisted on being closer to the cities. The village was nevertheless renamed Tatlısu in 1975 after the Turkish name of Mari. The rest of the village was repopulated by Turkish farmers who were settled from areas such as Konya, Adana, Araklı, Osmaniye, Çaykara, Kahramanmaraş and Gaziantep. In the 21st century, following the construction boom in Northern Cyprus, a number of Turkish Cypriots and Europeans bought real estate in the village.

Politics 
The town is administered by the Turkish Cypriot Tatlısu Municipality, founded in 1975. The current mayor is A. Hayri Orçan from the Democratic Party.

In 2014, a new town hall was inaugurated.

Culture, sports, and tourism
Turkish Cypriot Tatlısu Sports Club was founded in 1950, and now in Cyprus Turkish Football Association (CTFA) K-PET 2nd League.

International relations

Twin towns – sister cities
Akanthou is twinned with:
  Tarsus, Mersin, Turkey
 Sumqayit, Azerbaijan (since 2005)
  Altınova, Yalova, Turkey

References

External links
 

Municipalities in Famagusta District
Populated places in Gazimağusa District
Municipalities of Northern Cyprus
Cittaslow